Passyunk Square is a neighborhood in South Philadelphia bounded by Broad Street to the west, 6th Street to the east, Tasker Street to the south and Washington Avenue to the north.  Passyunk Square is bordered by the Bella Vista, Hawthorne, Central South Philadelphia, Wharton, and Point Breeze neighborhoods.   The neighborhood got its Lenape name from the 1800s Passyunk Township, Pennsylvania which named Passyunk Square Park, located between 12th, 13th, Reed and Wharton Streets. The park was eventually renamed Columbus Square Park, and subsequently the neighborhood became known as Columbus Square. Sue Montella, Geoff DiMasi, and a group of neighbors revived the Passyunk Square name when forming the Passyunk Square Civic Association in 2003.

History
Lafayette Cemetery was established in 1828 on the block between Federal and Wharton Streets and 9th and 10th Avenues. The cemetery was originally designed to hold 14,000 bodies, but by 1946, it was in disrepair and overcrowded with 47,000 bodies. In March 1946, the city condemned Lafayette Cemetery and relocated all of the remains to Evergreen Memorial Park in Bensalem Township, Pennsylvania. 

The former location of Lafayette Cemetery is used by the city of Philadelphia as the Capitolo Playground.

Education

The School District of Philadelphia serves the neighborhood.

Two K-8 schools, Fanny Jackson Coppin School (formerly the Federal Street School and Andrew Jackson School) and Eliza Butler Kirkbride School, are listed on the National Register of Historic Places. These schools serve portions of the neighborhood. Furness High School serves areas within both the Kirkbride and Jackson zones.

Demographics

 White - 68%; Black - 6%; Asian - 19%; Hispanic - 7%

Shopping district

The neighborhood is best known for its shopping and restaurants along the East Passyunk Avenue corridor.  

East Passyunk Avenue features a large number of privately owned shops, restaurants, and grocery stores; additionally, it has a number of businesses such as insurance offices, salons, and pharmacies. 

The southernmost portion of one of America's oldest curb markets, popularly called The Italian Market, also falls within the Association's boundaries.

Transportation
Passyunk Square is served by SEPTA's Broad Street Line at Tasker-Morris and Ellsworth-Federal stations. Several SEPTA bus lines run through the neighborhood.

See also
 Geno's Steaks
 Pat's King of Steaks
 South Fellini
 Passyunk Township, Pennsylvania
 South Philadelphia

External links

 Passyunk Square community website
 Business listings for East Passyunk
 East Passyunk Avenue Business Improvement District
 Phillyblog.com - South Philadelphia board
 Passyunk Avenue Revitalization Corporation
 Columbus Square Park
 Goldstar Park
 Dr. Nicola Capitolo Playground

References

Neighborhoods in Philadelphia